Trolleybuses in Dunedin were part of the Dunedin public transport system from 1950 until 1982.

History
Trolleybuses commenced operating in Dunedin on 24 February 1950 from Bond Street in the central business district to Opoho. By 1958 trolleybuses had replaced all of the city's trams operating on 14 routes. It was progressively closed from 1969, with the final route closing in July 1979. However the 1979 oil crisis resulted in part of the network being reopened the next month. It closed again in March 1982.

Vehicles
The fleet comprised 79 BUT RETB/1s built between 1950 and 1962. One is preserved at the Toitū Otago Settlers Museum and two by the Tramway Historical Society.

References

Dunedin
Transport in Dunedin
Trolleybus transport in New Zealand
1950 establishments in New Zealand
1982 disestablishments in New Zealand